Alysha Corrigan (born 25 January 1997 Charlottetown) is a Canadian rugby union player.

Corrigan competed for Canada at the 2021 Rugby World Cup in New Zealand. She was named player of the match in their Pool game victory over the United States at the World Cup.

Corrigan played for the University of Prince Edward Island. She plays for Saracens in the Premier 15s competition.

References 

1997 births
Canadian rugby union players
Living people
Canadian female rugby union players
Canada women's international rugby union players